Off the Hook is a British sitcom about a group of freshers at university. It was first broadcast on BBC Three and BBC HD between 10 September and 22 October 2009. The show's cast includes Jonathan Bailey, who plays the protagonist together with Danny Morgan, James Buckley, Joanna Cassidy and Georgia King.

Production
The series was commissioned as part of the BBC Switch strand which was aimed at teenagers. Its original title was Fresh. It first appeared online in small five-minute episodes in September 2008 before later being developed into a full series. It was filmed on location at the University of Westminster's Harrow campus, which is used as the backdrop for the fictional Bankside University.

Premise
The series centres on Danny Gordon (Bailey) as he embarks on his first year at Bankside University. Unbeknown to him his "worst best friend" from school, Shane McKay, has been awarded a place at Bankside via the clearing system, and proceeds to gatecrash Danny's university life. The pair share their student accommodation with Scarlet Hayes, Fred and Wendy "Weird Bloke".

The first episode introduces the characters and displays Danny's introduction into university life including life modelling, chatting up girls who have boyfriends at home and learning that there is a university degree called Moral Philosophy with Comparative Philology.

Cast 

 Jonathan Bailey as Danny Gordon
 Danny Morgan as Shane McKay
 James Buckley as Fred
 Joanna Cassidy as Scarlet
 Georgina King as Weird Bloke

References

External links

2009 British television series debuts
2009 British television series endings
2000s British teen sitcoms
2000s college television series
BBC television sitcoms
British college television series
English-language television shows
Television series about teenagers